Meitei Chanu (or, Meetei Chanu) literally means "Meitei woman" or "Meitei lady" in Meetei language. It may refer to:

 any woman (Chanu) of Meitei ethnicity (also known as Meetei ethnicity) 
 any Meitei woman using the Chanu (name suffix)
 Meitei Chanu (poem), a Meitei language poem by Lamabam Kamal, and the feminine personification of Meitei language (or Meitei literature) in the poem
 Meetei Chanu, or Miss Meitei Chanu, a traditional Meitei beauty pageant

See also 
 Meitei (disambiguation)
 Meetei
 Chanu (disambiguation)